Lucien Schaeffer (6 June 1928 – 28 December 2016) was a French football goalkeeper who was a member of the French squad at the 1948 Summer Olympics, but he did not play in any matches. Schaeffer died on 29 December 2016 at the age of 88.

References

External links
 
 Profile

1928 births
2016 deaths
French people of German descent
French footballers
Association football goalkeepers
RC Strasbourg Alsace players
Valenciennes FC players
Ligue 1 players
Olympic footballers of France
Footballers at the 1948 Summer Olympics